Marthamycetaceae is a family of fungi belonging to the order Chaetomellales.

Genera:
 Cyclaneusma
 Marthamyces
 Melittosporiella Höhn.
 Mellitiosporium Corda
 Naemacyclus
 Phragmiticola Sherwood
 Propolina
 Propolis
 Ramomarthamyces

References

Leotiomycetes
Ascomycota families